Porcellionidae is a terrestrial family of the order Isopoda.

This family contains 530 species, found on every continent except Antarctica.

The ventral plate of the thoracic exoskeleton flare out slightly over the legs. This "flare" is called the epimeron. The uropods, antenna-like structures at the back of the specimen, are flattened out and spearlike, and extend beyond the last exoskeletal plate.

Genera
The family contains 19 genera, and two further genera (Inchanga and Mahehia) may be included.

Acaeroplastes Verhoeff, 1918
Agabiformius Verhoeff, 1908
Atlantidium Arcangeli, 1936
Brevurus Schmalfuss, 1986
Caeroplastes Verhoeff, 1918
Congocellio Arcangeli, 1950
Dorypoditius Verhoeff, 1942
Leptotrichus Budde-Lund, 1885
Lucasius Kinahan, 1859
Mica Budde-Lund, 1908
Pondo Barnard, 1937
Porcellio Latreille, 1804
Porcellionides Miers, 1877
Proporcellio Verhoeff, 1907
Soteriscus Vandel, 1956
Thermocellio Verhoeff, 1942
Tropicocellio Arcangeli, 1950
Tura Budde-Lund, 1908
Uramba Budde-Lund, 1908

References

 
Woodlice
Crustacean families
Taxa named by Johann Friedrich von Brandt
Taxa named by Julius Theodor Christian Ratzeburg